Eulogies is the fifth studio album by Christian metal band Wolves at the Gate. The album was produced by Steve Cobucci & Joey Alarcon, and released on March 11, 2022, by Solid State Records.

Release
On April 16, 2021, the band released a new single, "Stop The Bleeding", which was followed by another single, "Shadows", on October 15, 2021. After releasing two more singles, "Lights & Fire" and "Peace That Starts the War", they announced on March 2, 2022 that their fifth studio album, "Eulogies" would be released on March 11 through Solid State Records.

Reception

The album has been received well, with Zachary Van Dyke of Rock on Purpose saying "While they haven't reinvented metalcore, what they have done is create an incredibly impactful album that stands above the crowd."

Track listing
All songs written and composed by Steve Cobucci except track 12 (written and composed by Shane Barnad)

Personnel
Steve Cobucci – rhythm guitar, clean vocals 
Ben Summers – bass guitar, backing vocals
Nick Detty – unclean vocals, piano 
Abishai Collingsworth – drums 
Joey Alarcon – lead guitar

References

2022 albums
Solid State Records albums
Wolves at the Gate (band) albums